Delias ninus, the Malayan Jezebel, is a butterfly in the family Pieridae. It was described by Alfred Russel Wallace in 1867. It is found in the Indomalayan realm.

The wingspan is about 70–85 mm.

Subspecies
Delias ninus alluviorum Fruhstorfer, 1905 (western Sumatra)
Delias ninus babai Yagishita, 1997 (Myanmar)
Delias ninus ninus (Peninsular Malaysia)
Delias ninus parthenia Staudinger, 1892 (northern Borneo)
Delias ninus saranensis Yagishita, 1993 (Mt. Saran, western Kalimantan)
Delias ninus shoujii Yagishita, 1993 (Mt. Bawang, western Kalimantan)

References

External links
Delias at Markku Savela's Lepidoptera and Some Other Life Forms

ninus
Butterflies described in 1867
Butterflies of Asia
Taxa named by Alfred Russel Wallace